Circle of Growth is the debut album by Irish grunge band Paradox.

Track listing

Credits
Pete Mac – Guitar, vocals and Bass
Mike Mac – Drums / vocals
Produced by Pete Mac and Mike Mac

External links 
 allmusic.com

2002 debut albums
Paradox (Irish band) albums